Colias johanseni, the Johansen's sulphur, is a butterfly in the family Pieridae found in North America. It is endemic to Nunavut, Canada.

Flight period is July.

Wingspan is from 35 to 38 mm.

Larvae feed on Hedysarum mackenzii.

References

johanseni
Butterflies of North America
Insects of the Arctic
Butterflies described in 1990
Endemic fauna of Canada
Endemic fauna of Nunavut